Pye-dog, or sometimes pariah dog, is a term used to describe an ownerless, half-wild, free-ranging dog that lives in or close to human settlements throughout Asia. The term is derived from the Sanskrit para, which translates to "outsider".

The United Kennel Club uses the term pariah dog to classify various breeds in a sighthound and pariah group.

Gallery

See also 
 Hawaiian Poi Dog
 Indian pariah dog
 Sinhala Hound

References 

Dog types
Feral dogs